Bonamia alatisemina is a herb in the family Convolvulaceae.

It blooms between April and May producing pink-white flowers.

It is found on sandplains in the Kimberley and Pilbara regions of Western Australia where it grows in sandy soils.

References

alatisemina
Plants described in 1987